Sacha Dhawan (born 1 May 1984) is a British actor. He began his career in the ITV series Out of Sight (1997–98), The Last Train (1999), and Weirdsister College (2001–02). He originated role of Akthar in the play The History Boys (2004–06) and reprised his role in its film adaptation (2006).

Dhawan has since played Paul Jatri in the BBC One comedy-drama Last Tango in Halifax (2012), Waris Hussein in the BBC Two docudrama An Adventure in Space and Time (2013), Davos in Marvel's Iron Fist (2017–18), Orlo in The Great (2020–21) on Hulu, and The Master in the science fiction series Doctor Who (2020–22).

Early life
Dhawan was born in Bramhall, Stockport, to Indian parents from Jalandhar, Punjab.

Dhawan trained at the Laine-Johnson Theatre School in Manchester, and started acting at the age of twelve. He attended Aquinas College in Stockport.

Dhawan was diagnosed with Crohn's disease in 2006. In 2016, he suffered from flare-ups whilst filming Iron Fist in New York.

Career

Television and film
Dhawan has appeared in a number of television shows in the United Kingdom. He had recurring roles in Weirdsister College, in which he played Azmat Madaridi, and series two and three of the children's TV series Out of Sight. He appeared in the miniseries The Last Train (1999), and has guest starred in episodes on EastEnders, Altogether Now, and City Central. He also appeared in 2008 ITV drama, Wired, as Ben Chandrakar, alongside Jodie Whittaker and Laurence Fox. He was part of an ensemble cast on the NBC sitcom Outsourced, which aired during the 2010–11 season. In November 2013, Dhawan portrayed director Waris Hussein in An Adventure in Space and Time, a BBC Two biographical television film on the creation of the BBC science fiction television series Doctor Who as part of its 50th Anniversary celebration. He also appeared as Paul Jatri, a 22-year-old man involved with a woman twice his age, in the first series of BBC One's Last Tango in Halifax. He plays the part of Davos in the Netflix series Iron Fist in both the seasons. He starred as Sathnam Sanghera in the critically acclaimed The Boy with the Topknot, shown on BBC 2 in 2017. He appeared in four episodes of the twelfth series of Doctor Who as the latest incarnation of the renegade Time Lord known as the Master. He plays the role of Count Orlo, advisor to Catherine the Great, in comedy-drama TV series The Great.

Theatre
Dhawan originated the role of Akthar in Alan Bennett's play The History Boys. After playing Akthar in the original stage production he reprised the role in the Broadway, Sydney, Wellington and Hong Kong productions, and radio and film versions of the play.

For his performance in Bradford Riots he won the 2007 Royal Television Society Award for On-Screen Breakthrough.

In July 2018 Dhawan reunited with History Boys playwright Alan Bennett and co-star Samuel Barnett for Bennett's new play Allelujah! at the Bridge Theatre.

Filmography

Film

Television

Video games

Radio and theatre

References

External links
 
 
 
 
 

1984 births
Living people
Actors from Stockport
English male film actors
English male radio actors
English male stage actors
English male television actors
English male video game actors
English male voice actors
English people of Indian descent
People educated at Bramhall High School
People from Bramhall
People with Crohn's disease
20th-century English male actors
21st-century English male actors